Syzygium parameswaranii is a species of plant in the family Myrtaceae. It is endemic to Tamil Nadu in India.

References

parameswaranii
Flora of Tamil Nadu
Endangered plants
Taxonomy articles created by Polbot